Amnon Yariv (born April 13, 1930) is an Israeli-American professor of applied physics and electrical engineering at Caltech, known for innovations in optoelectronics. Yariv obtained his B.S., M.S. and PhD. in electrical engineering from University of California, Berkeley in 1954, 1956 and 1958, respectively.

In 2010, Yariv was selected as a winner of the National Medal of Science for "scientific and engineering contributions to photonics and quantum electronics that have profoundly impacted lightwave communications and the field of optics as a whole".  He has also been selected to receive the IEEE Photonics Award for 2011.

Yariv has been a member of the National Academy of Sciences since 1991.
In 1985 he was awarded the Harold Pender Award by the University of Pennsylvania.
In 1992 he was awarded the Harvey Prize by the Technion in Haifa, Israel, for "pioneering contributions to opto-electronics, wave propagation in crystals and nonlinear and phase-conjugate optics, and his demonstration of semiconductor-based integrated optics technology leading to the development of high-speed and stable solid-state lasers".

Yariv has authored several texts on optical electronics and photonics.
He has said that the highlight of his group's work was the invention of the semiconductor distributed feedback laser, a device widely used in the Internet's fiber-optic communications.

Amnon Yariv currently resides in Pasadena, California.  He is married to Frances Yariv.  He has three daughters: Danielle Yariv, Dana Yariv and Gabriela (Gavi) Yariv.

References

External links
 Optical and Quantum Electronics Laboratory, Yariv's Caltech group
 Laureate Photos with President Obama

1930 births
Living people
Israeli emigrants to the United States
20th-century American physicists
21st-century American physicists
Members of the United States National Academy of Sciences
National Medal of Science laureates
Jewish American physicists
American electronics engineers
Laser researchers
California Institute of Technology faculty
Members of the United States National Academy of Engineering
Israeli physicists
Optical engineers
Optical physicists
UC Berkeley College of Engineering alumni
Jews in Mandatory Palestine
Israeli electrical engineers
Israeli academics
Electrical engineering academics
21st-century American Jews